CTA may refer to:

Legislation
Children's Television Act, American legislation passed in 1990 that enforces a certain degree of educational television
Counter-Terrorism Act 2008
Criminal Tribes Act, British legislation in India passed in 1871 which labelled entire communities as criminal

Organizations

Asia
Central Tibetan Administration
China Tourism Academy
Chinese Taoist Association
Crystal Thai Airlines

Europe, Africa, and South America
Cairo Transportation Authority
Central de los Trabajadores Argentinos
Cyprus Turkish Airlines
Technical Centre for Agricultural and Rural Cooperation ACP-EU (CTA)
CTA International

North America
California Teachers Association, a labor union
California Technology Agency, a California cabinet-level state agency
Call to Action, a Christian organization
Canadian Transportation Agency, an independent tribunal of the Government of Canada
Canadian Trucking Alliance, a Canadian federation of provincial trucking associations
Central Toronto Academy, formerly called Central Commerce Collegiate
Chicago Transit Authority, the official public transportation authority for the city of Chicago
Chisholm Trail Academy
Colorado Translators Association
Columbus Torah Academy
Consolidated Tape Association, which oversees stock market transactions in the United States
Consumer Technology Association, formerly Consumer Electronics Association

Places
Central African Republic (FIFA code: CTA)
Catania-Fontanarossa Airport (IATA code)
Central Texas Airport

Professions
Chartered tax adviser, a tax accountant who is a member of the: 
Chartered Institute of Taxation (UK)
Tax Institute (Australia) (Australia)
Commodity trading advisor
Cryptologic technician administrative

Science
 Cellulose triacetate
 Chain transfer agent
 Charge transfer amplifier
 Cherenkov Telescope Array, a project to build a system of very high energy gamma ray telescopes.
 The medical jargon "Clear to auscultation", for lungs are clear when listening; see List of medical abbreviations: C
 Cognitive Task Analysis
 Computed tomography angiography
 Conditioned taste aversion
 Constant temperature anemometry
 CTA, a codon for the amino acid Leucine

Other
Call to action (marketing), a web design tenet that requires each page to clearly indicate the desired user response
 Call to action (political), a call to activists to participate in a direct action or similar political activity
Call to arms
Cased telescoped ammunition
Central technical area, an equipment room used in broadcasting facilities
The Chicago Transit Authority, former name of the American band Chicago
Container Terminal Altenwerder
Common Tasks for Assessment, an educational programme run by the Department of Education of South Africa
Common Travel Area, comprising Ireland, Great Britain, the Isle of Man and the Channel Islands
Control area, controlled airspace that exists in the vicinity of an airport
Copyright transfer agreement, used in publishing
 Template:CTA